Kouk Ballangk is a commune (khum) of Mongkol Borei District in Banteay Meanchey Province in northwestern Cambodia.

Villages

Kouk Ballangk
 Ta An
 Pralay Chrey
 Cheung Chab
 Phat Sanday
 Char Thmei
 Ph'av Thmei
 Ta Sal

References

Communes of Banteay Meanchey province
Mongkol Borey District